Thomas Passmore (19 June 1884 – 8 May 1955) was a cyclist from Cape Colony. He competed in four events at the 1908 Summer Olympics.

References

External links
 

1884 births
1955 deaths
South African male cyclists
Olympic cyclists of South Africa
Cyclists at the 1908 Summer Olympics
Sportspeople from Cape Colony